Parliamentary elections were held in Mali on 13 April 1997. However, the results were invalidated by the Constitutional Court due to "serious irregularities". According to the Electoral Law, fresh elections had to be held within three months, and were ultimately held in July and August.

Results

References

Mali
1997 in Mali
1997 04
Annulled elections